Yord may refer to:
Yord-e Anjir
Yord-e Basravi
Yord-e Jamal
Yord-e Khalaf
Yord-e Khordu
Yord-e Qasemali

See also
Yurd (disambiguation)